The Foreign Policy Research Institute (FPRI) is an American think tank based in Philadelphia, Pennsylvania, that conducts research on geopolitics, international relations, and international security in the various regions of the world and on ethnic conflict, U.S. national security, terrorism, and on think tanks themselves. It publishes a quarterly journal, Orbis, and a series of monographs, books, and electronic newsletters.

History
FPRI was founded by Ambassador Robert Strausz-Hupé, a Vienna native who immigrated to the United States in 1923. Dissatisfied with the containment strategy of John Foster Dulles and the Eisenhower administration's foreign policy in general, Strausz-Hupé founded FPRI in 1955 with support from the University of Pennsylvania, an Ivy League university in Philadelphia, and the Smith Richardson Foundation. In 1957, FPRI began publishing Orbis, its quarterly journal.

Since the end of the Cold War, the institute has focused on education in international affairs, sponsoring various programs in Philadelphia-area schools as well as conferences and seminars for high school and junior college teachers and lectures for the general public.

Research programs
FPRI manages and sponsors several divisions and programs, including its Program on National Security (chaired by John Lehman); its Asia Program (directed by Jacques deLisle); its Program on the Middle East (directed by Aaron Stein); its Eurasia Program (co-directed by Chris Miller and Maia Otarashvili); its Center for Study of America and the West (founded in 1997, directed by Ronald J. Granieri, and chaired by Walter A. McDougall); and the Africa Program (chaired by Charles A. Ray).

Board of Trustees
As of 2021, FPRI's board of trustees includes:
 Robert Freedman, chairman
 Dov S. Zakheim, vice-chair
 Devon Cross, vice-chair
 Adrian A. Basora
 Larry Ceisler
 John Hillen
 Charles A. Ray

Funding
Funding details as of 2019:

Publications 
Orbis 
e-notes : a catalyst for ideas 
Foreign Policy Research Institute footnotes 
Foreign Policy Research Institute wire

See also

Think Tanks and Civil Societies Program (TTCSP)

References

External links 

Orbis magazine

 
1955 establishments in Pennsylvania
Foreign policy and strategy think tanks in the United States
New Right organizations (United States)
Organizations based in Philadelphia
Political and economic think tanks in the United States